Murry Sidlin (Baltimore, United States, 1940), is an American conductor and professor.

Biography
Born in Baltimore, Maryland, in 1940, Sidlin studied at the Peabody Institute, graduating in 1968 with a Master's degree.  Sidlin's first appointment after graduating was as Assistant Conductor at the Baltimore Symphony Orchestra under Sergiu Comissiona. He was later appointed Resident conductor at the National Symphony Orchestra under Antal Doráti, and with Oregon Symphony Orchestra. He was also the Music Director of the New Haven Symphony Orchestra, the Long Beach Symphony Orchestra, and the Tulsa Philharmonic.

For 32 years he was co-director (together with David Zinman) of the American Academy of Conducting at Aspen Festival. Alumni of the program during his tenure include Peter Oundjian, Cristian Macelaru, Tomas Netopil, Tito Muñoz, Philippe Bach, José De Eusebio, Hugh Wolff, James Gaffigan, Apo Hsu, Lawrence Golan, Kenneth Woods, Sasha Mäkilä, Kenneth Kiesler, Josep Caballé Domenech, and David Hayes.

He is currently an Ordinary professor of Conducting at Catholic University of America's Benjamin T. Rome School of Music, and for ten years until 2012 served as the Dean of the School.

Sidlin is a member of Prague Society for International Cooperation, a respected NGO whose main goals are networking and the development of a new generation of responsible, well-informed leaders and thinkers.

References

External links
https://web.archive.org/web/20140302145232/http://www.murrysidlin.com/_home/About_Sidlin.html
http://music.cua.edu/faculty/sidlin.cfm

American male conductors (music)
21st-century American conductors (music)
Musicians from Baltimore
Year of birth missing (living people)
Living people
Benjamin T. Rome School of Music, Drama, and Art faculty
20th-century American conductors (music)
Peabody Institute alumni
20th-century American male musicians
21st-century American male musicians